George Alfred Townsend (January 30, 1841 – April 15, 1914) was an American journalist and novelist. He worked as a war correspondent during the American Civil War. Townsend wrote under the pen name "Gath", which was derived by adding an "H" to his initials, and inspired by the biblical passage II Samuel 1:20, "Tell it not in Gath, publish it not in the streets of Askalon."

Life and career
Townsend was born in Georgetown, Delaware, on January 30, 1841.  He originally wrote for The Philadelphia Inquirer, and in 1861 he moved to the New York Herald. He is considered to have been the youngest correspondent of the war. In 1865, Townsend was Washington correspondent for the New York World, covering the assassination of Abraham Lincoln and its aftermath. His daily reports filed between April 17 – May 17 were published later in 1865 as a book, The Life, Crime, and Capture of John Wilkes Booth, reprinted in 1977, and published in audio version in 2009.

Immediately following the war, he married Elizabeth Evans Rhodes of Philadelphia. By 1868, he had become one of the most quotable Washington correspondents, working for the "Chicago Tribune," and, after 1874, for the "New York Graphic."  His letters, published several times a week, were several columns long, and included lively word-portraits of politicians and opinion. He established and edited, with an Ohio journalist and politician, Donn Piatt, the Capital at Washington, D.C., in 1871, but parted company with Piatt soon after.

In 1884 Townsend began building a baronial estate in the Catoctin Mountains called "Gapland," near Burkittsville, Maryland. Gapland was built on the site of the Battle of Crampton's Gap, and is in close proximity to the battlefields of South Mountain and Antietam.  The estate was composed of several buildings, including Gapland Hall, Gapland Lodge, the Den and Library Building, and a mausoleum (notable for its inscription of "Good Night Gath"). In 1896, Townsend built the War Correspondents' Memorial Arch, the first such monument tribute to war journalists.

His novels included The Entailed Hat (1884), which fictionalized a true story of a woman named Patty Cannon who kidnapped free blacks and sold them into slavery. Townsend's other works include the short story collection Tales of the Chesapeake (1880) and the novel Katy of Catoctin (1887).

The Gapland estate is now Gathland State Park.  Several buildings still stand, including Gapland Hall (which is the park headquarters) and the mausoleum.

Townsend left Gapland in 1911, and died three years later in New York City. He was buried at Laurel Hill Cemetery in Philadelphia.  The site was given to the State of Maryland and in 1949 became Gathland State Park.

Notes

References
 Gathland State Park, Maryland Park Service
 Historical Marker Database

External links
George Alfred Townsend Collection at University of Delaware Library
 
 
 
Works by George Alfred Townsend at Google Books (scanned books original editions illustrated) 
George Alfred Townsend Works

1841 births
1914 deaths
American newspaper reporters and correspondents
People from Georgetown, Delaware
People from Burkittsville, Maryland
War correspondents of the American Civil War